Jazzpunkensemblet (established 1983 in Oslo, Norway) is a Norwegian jazz ensemble orchestra led by the famous musicians Jon Eberson on guitar and Nils Petter Molvær on trumpet, and known for a clean style duel between two rhythm sections, and the two records Live At Rockefeller (1991) and Thirteen Rounds (1998), presenting compositions by Jon Eberson.

They visited a series of festivals and concert halls in the 1990s, among them the 1998 Moldejazz.

Band members 
Woodwinds
Erik Balke - saxophone
Tore Brunborg - saxophone
Morten Halle - saxophone

Brass
Nils Petter Molvær - trumpet
Torbjørn Sunde - trombone

Rhythm section
Jon Eberson - guitar
Christian Wallumrød - keyboards
Bugge Wesseltoft - keyboards
Bjørn Kjellemyr - double bass
Tom Erik Antonsen - bass
Pål Thowsen - drums
Bjørn Jenssen - drums
Paolo Vinaccia - drums

Past members
Jon Balke - piano, keyboards
Geir Holmsen - bass
Jon Christensen - drums

Discography 
1991: Live At Rockefeller (Odin Records)
1998: Thirteen Rounds (Curling Legs)

References 

Norwegian jazz ensembles
Musical groups established in 1991
1983 establishments in Norway
Musical groups from Oslo
Music in Bergen
1991 establishments in Norway